Deportes Concepción is a Honduran football club based on San Marcos, Honduras.

History
The club was relegated to Liga Mayor de Honduras at the end of the 2006–07 season. Back in the second division, they were removed from the competition after failing to show up for two games in the 2009 Apertura.

References

Football clubs in Honduras